St Peter's Church is in Middlewich Road, Minshull Vernon, Cheshire, England.  It is an active Anglican parish church in the deanery of Nantwich, the archdeaconry of Macclesfield, and the diocese of Chester.  Its benefice is combined with that of St Leonard, Warmingham.  The church is recorded in the National Heritage List for England as a designated Grade I listed building.  It was a Commissioners' church, having received a grant towards its construction from the Church Building Commission.

History

The parish of Minshull Vernon was formed in 1840, and the earlier church stood on a different site nearer to where Leighton Hospital now stands.  This church was damaged by fire and was demolished.  St Peter's was built between 1847 and 1849 to a design by John Matthews, and consecrated on 12 December 1849.  A grant of £150 was given towards its construction by the Church Building Commission, the total cost of its building being £1,700.  A north transept to accommodate the organ was added in 1903, and this was extended in 1913 by Harold Sheldon.  Electricity was installed in the church in 1959, and a new vestry was added to the west end of the church in 1966.

Architecture

The church is constructed in stone with slate roofs.  Its plan consists of a four-bay nave, a north porch, a chancel that is narrower and lower than the nave, a north transept for the organ, and a south vestry.  On the west gable is a double bellcote.  Most of the windows are lancets, with a triple lancet at the east end. Inside the church is an oak pulpit and a lectern in the shape of an eagle.  On the north wall of the chancel is a trefoil-headed sedilia.  The choir benches are carved with poppyheads.  The stained glass in the east window was installed in 1879.  The glass in the north window of the chancel was moved from a Congregational church in Cheadle in 1974.  Stained glass was added to the small window above the chancel arch to celebrate the millennium. Seven further stained glass windows, from a redundant church in Cheadle, were added in 2016. These windows, and the refurbishment of the choir vestry, were dedicated by the Right Rev. Peter Forster, Bishop of Chester, on 3 July 2016, the 50th anniversary of the vestry's original dedication.  The three-manual pipe organ was built in 1847 by Wadsworth.

Churchyard

The churchyard contains the war grave, standing east of the church, of a soldier of World War I.

See also

Listed buildings in Minshull Vernon

References

Church of England church buildings in Cheshire
Grade II listed churches in Cheshire
Churches completed in 1849
19th-century Church of England church buildings
Gothic Revival church buildings in England
Gothic Revival architecture in Cheshire
Diocese of Chester
Commissioners' church buildings
1840 establishments in England